Husby is a district in Rinkeby-Kista borough, Stockholm, Sweden. Husby has 11,551 inhabitants as of December 31, 2007.

Husby is located on the blue Metro line. The main construction of modern Husby, with its multi-level concrete apartment buildings, started in 1972 as part of the Million Programme. The subway station was opened in 1977 and the train takes approx. 20 minutes to Stockholm City. The name of the suburb was taken from a former royal farm, still located in the area. The streets of Husby are named after cities in Norway. There are many runestones in the surroundings of Husby, remnants from when Vikings used to live here.

Husby has the lowest income per capita of any district of Stockholm. In 2014, more than 80% of the population had minority background, mostly from Middle East and Africa.

In its December 2015 report, Police in Sweden placed the district in the most severe category of urban areas with high crime rates.

On 30 December 2016, shopkeepers decided to close their businesses from 1300 onwards due to the high number of robberies and burglaries targeting them.

In 2017, local authorities decided to hire security guards to help the businesses, but no private security company wanted to take on the job.

According to Finnish public service broadcaster Yle, in 2018, economist Takaaki Mitsuhashi from Japan described his visit to Husby: "whatever it was, it wasn't Sweden. We don't want those developments in Japan".

2013 riots

In May 2013, the district was the center of worldwide attention, due to riots that spread to several other parts of Stockholm. Over the course of three days, approximately 129 cars were burned, garages were set on fire, and the rioters engaged in sporadic clashes with the police.

Notable people from Husby
Patrik Isaksson (singer)

See also
Husby metro station
 Vulnerable area - socially deprived areas in Sweden

References

Districts in Västerort
Metropolitan Stockholm